The Isle of Man men's cricket team toured Spain in February 2023 to play a six-match Twenty20 International (T20I) series against Spain. The venue for the series was the La Manga Club Ground in Atamaria, within Spain's Murcia region. Spain won the series 5–0 with one match washed out by rain. A number of records were broken in the final match of the series, in which Isle of Man were bowled a for just 10 runs and Spain completed their chase in just two legitimate deliveries.

Squads

T20I series

1st T20I

2nd T20I

3rd T20I

4th T20I

5th T20I

6th T20I

Notes

References

External links
 Series home at ESPNcricinfo

International cricket competitions in 2022–23